The 1956–57 international cricket season was from September 1956 to April 1957.

Season overview

October

Australia in Pakistan

Australia in India

November

India in Ceylon

December

England in South Africa

England in India

March

England in the West Indies

April

India in Ceylon

References

International cricket competitions by season
1956 in cricket
1957 in cricket